Same-sex marriage in Australia has been legal since 9 December 2017. Legislation to allow same-sex marriage, the Marriage Amendment (Definition and Religious Freedoms) Act 2017, passed the Australian Parliament on 7 December 2017 and received royal assent from the Governor-General the following day. The law came into effect on 9 December, immediately recognising overseas same-sex marriages. The first same-sex wedding under Australian law was held on 15 December 2017. The passage of the law followed a voluntary postal survey of all Australians, in which 61.6% of respondents supported legalisation of same-sex marriage.

Other types of recognition for same-sex couples are also available. Under federal law, same-sex couples can also be recognised as de facto relationships. De facto couples have most of the same rights and responsibilities afforded to married couples, although these rights may be difficult to assert and are not always recognised in practice. Although there is no national civil union or relationships register scheme in Australia, most states and territories have legislated for civil unions or domestic partnership registries. Registered unions are recognised as de facto relationships under federal law.

Prior to legalisation, 22 bills to allow same-sex marriage were introduced to Parliament between September 2004 and May 2017. These failed attempts came after the Howard government amended the law in August 2004 to prevent same-sex marriages. The Australian Capital Territory passed a same-sex marriage law in December 2013 that was struck down by the High Court for inconsistency with federal law.

De facto relationships
De facto relationships, defined in the federal Family Law Act 1975, are available to both same-sex and opposite-sex couples. De facto relationships provide couples who live together on a genuine domestic basis with many of the same rights and benefits as married couples. Two people can become a de facto couple by entering into a registered relationship (i.e. a civil union or domestic partnership) or by being assessed as a de facto couple by the Federal Circuit and Family Court. Couples who live together are generally recognised as a de facto relationship, even if they have not registered or officially documented their relationship.

Rudd Government 2008–2009 reforms

Following the Australian Human Rights Commission's 2007 report "Same-Sex: Same Entitlements", and an audit of federal legislation, in 2009 the Rudd Government introduced several reforms designed to equalise treatment for same-sex couples and same-sex families. The reforms amended 85 Commonwealth laws to eliminate discrimination against same-sex couples and their children in a wide range of areas. The reforms came in the form of two pieces of legislation, the Same-Sex Relationships (Equal Treatment in Commonwealth LawsGeneral Law Reform) Act 2008 and the Same-Sex Relationships (Equal Treatment in Commonwealth LawsSuperannuation) Act 2008. These laws, which passed the Parliament in November 2008, amended 70 other existing Commonwealth acts to equalise treatment for same-sex couples and their children. 

As a result of these reforms same-sex couples were treated equally with heterosexual couples in most areas of federal law. For instance, with relation to social security and general family law, same-sex couples were previously not recognised as a couple for social security or family assistance purposes. A person who had a same-sex de facto partner was treated as a single person. The reforms ensured that same-sex couples were, for the first time under Australian law, recognised as a couple akin to opposite-sex partners. Consequently, a same-sex couple receives the same rate of social security and family assistance payments as an opposite-sex couple. Because of constitutional limitations, Australia cannot have a national registered partnership, civil union or same-sex relationship scheme. Under the Australian Constitution, the Federal Government only has power in relation to marriages. States would have to refer their powers to the Commonwealth to allow a national registered partnership, civil union or same-sex relationship scheme.

Legislative history prior to de facto recognition
In 2004, amendments to the Superannuation Industry (Supervision) Act 1993 to allow tax free payment of superannuation benefits to be made to the surviving partner on an interdependent relationships, included same-sex couples, or a relationship where one person was financially dependent on another person. Prior to 2008, same-sex couples were only recognised by the Federal Government in very limited circumstances. For example, since the 1990s, same-sex foreign partners of Australian citizens have been able to receive residency permits in Australia known as "interdependency visas". Following a national inquiry into financial and work-related discrimination against same-sex relationships, on 21 June 2007, the Human Rights and Equal Opportunity Commission (HREOC) released its Same-Sex: Same Entitlements report. The Commission identified 58 Commonwealth law statutes and provisions that explicitly discriminate against same-sex couples by using the term 'member of the opposite sex'.

The previous conservative Howard Government banned its departments from making submissions to the HREOC inquiry regarding financial discrimination experienced by same-sex couples.

The report found that 100 statutes and provisions under federal law discriminated against same-sex couples by using the term "member of the opposite sex", from aged care, superannuation, childcare, Medicare (including the Pharmaceutical Benefits Scheme) through to pensions. "All the basics that opposite-gender couples are legally entitled to and take for granted" were things same-sex couples were effectively barred from utilising under the former system.

Differences between de facto relationships and marriages
Since 1 March 2009, some legal differences remain with respect to treatment of couples in a de facto relationship and heterosexual couples in a marriage. Differences exist between the rights of a de facto couple and a married couple in relation to family law matters, including property settlements and entitlements to spousal maintenance. A de facto relationship must have ended for the court to make an order for property settlement or spousal maintenance, though this requirement does not exist for married couples. For a de facto partner to seek an order for property settlement, the Court must be satisfied of at least one of the following:
 The period of the de facto relationship was for at least two years; or
 There is a child in the de facto relationship; or
 The relationship is or was registered under a prescribed law of a State or Territory; or
 That failure to make an order would result in serious injustice due to the significant contributions made by one party.

By way of comparison, for a married couple, it is enough merely to have been married to attract the jurisdiction of the Court for property and spousal maintenance.

Furthermore, it is possible that individuals in a de facto relationship can be treated substantively different to a person in a marriage. In the event of an unexpected end to a de facto relationship (such as death of a partner), the surviving partner must often prove the existence of a relationship in order to be registered as the next of kin on a death certificate and receive government bereavement payments and access to a partner's superannuation. These requirements vary on a state by state basis. Given that, prior to the legalisation of same-sex marriage, same-sex couples did not have the option to marry, as heterosexual couples did, these discrepancies could have a particularly discriminatory impact on same-sex couples. The rights of a de facto partner may be poorly understood by government departments, resulting in occasions where said couples have not had their rights upheld.

In April 2014, a federal court judge ruled that a heterosexual couple who had a child and lived together for 13 years were not in a de facto relationship and thus the court had no jurisdiction to divide up their property under family law following a request for separation. In his ruling, the judge stated that "de facto relationship(s) may be described as "marriage-like" but it is not a marriage and has significant differences socially, financially and emotionally."

De facto relationships often face an onerous burden of proof before rights that are automatically granted to married couples can be accessed. This means partners may have to provide evidence about their living and childcare arrangements, sexual relationship, finances, ownership of property, commitment to a shared life and how they present as a couple in public. This can present difficulties when de facto relationships are legally contested by other people, usually other family members. Marriages rarely encounter such difficulties as they are generally regarded as immediate and incontrovertible.

Same-sex marriage

Federal law
The federal Marriage Act 1961 governs marriage in Australia. The Act defines marriage as "the union of 2 people to the exclusion of all others, voluntarily entered into for life".

History

The Marriage Act 1961 did not explicitly define the legal meaning of the word "marriage" prior to 2004. Section 46(1) of the Act, however, has always included a provision requiring celebrants to state the legal nature of marriage in Australia. Prior to the legalisation of same-sex marriage, the requirement was to state marriage is the union of "a man and a woman", or words to that effect, in line with the 1866 English case of Hyde v Hyde. The words in section 46(1) have been seen as a description or exhortation rather than a legal definition.

In August 2004, the Howard Government introduced a bill to insert a definition of marriage in the Interpretation section (section 5) of the Act; as "the union of a man and a woman to the exclusion of all others, voluntarily entered into for life". The bill also inserted a new provision in the Act (section 88EA) which stipulated any foreign marriages of same-sex couples "must not be recognised as a marriage in Australia". The bill was supported by the opposition Labor Party and came amidst increased public debate on the issue following the judicial legalisation of same-sex marriage in Massachusetts and Canada. Then-Prime Minister John Howard later stated that the amendments were partially motivated by a desire to prevent same-sex couples having their marriages recognised by the courts, as was being litigated at the time. Additional amendments to the Family Law Act 1975 prevented same-sex couples from adopting children in inter-country adoption arrangements, although these restrictions were eventually relaxed in 2014. The bill passed the Parliament on 13 August 2004 and went into effect on the day it received royal assent, 16 August 2004.

Between 2004 and 2017, there were 22 unsuccessful bills to legalise same-sex marriage in the Parliament. The Labor governments of Kevin Rudd and Julia Gillard (2007–13) were divided on the issue. Despite passing a resolution at the party's national conference in December 2011 to support same-sex marriage, the party held a conscience vote when two private member's bills to legalise same-sex marriage were debated in the Parliament in September 2012. The legislation was opposed by Prime Minister Gillard and several other Labor MPs, as well as by the opposition Coalition, led by Tony Abbott. The first bill failed in the House of Representatives by 98 votes to 42 and a similar bill was rejected by the Senate by 41 votes to 26.

Same-sex marriage caused significant tension within the Abbott Government (2013–15). It resolved in August 2015 to hold a national vote on same-sex marriage sometime after the 2016 federal election, in the form of either a plebiscite or constitutional referendum. This policy was maintained by the Turnbull Government (2015–18) after Malcolm Turnbull (a supporter of same-sex marriage) replaced Abbott as Prime Minister following a leadership challenge. The bill providing for the plebiscite (which would have been held on 11 February 2017) passed the House of Representatives by 76 votes to 67 on 20 October 2016, The bill was rejected by the Senate 7 November 2016 by 33 votes to 29, as the Government had failed to attract the support of the opposition Labor Party, minor party the Greens and several Senate crossbenchers, who demanded that same-sex marriage be legalised through a parliamentary vote.

Despite initially suggesting the Government had "no plans to take any other measures on this issue", Prime Minister Malcolm Turnbull came under increasing pressure to change policy and allow a conscience vote in the Parliament. By August 2017, several Liberal Party MPs stated they would consider crossing the floor to suspend standing orders and force debate on same-sex marriage legislation against the Government's wishes. Consequently, at a Liberal party room meeting on 7 August 2017, the Government resolved to conduct a voluntary postal survey on the matter later in the year. The Government stated the survey would only occur in the event the Senate again rejected the legislation enabling the plebiscite, which it did on 9 August 2017. 

On 9 August 2017, the Government directed the Australian Statistician to conduct a survey of all enrolled voters to measure support for same-sex marriage. The direction was given to bypass the need for the Parliament to approve a plebiscite. The direction was legally challenged, but was upheld by the High Court. The survey was held between 12 September and 7 November 2017 and returned a 61.6% vote in favour of same-sex marriage. The Government responded by confirming it will facilitate the passage of a private member's bill legalising same-sex marriage before the end of the year.

The Marriage Amendment (Definition and Religious Freedoms) Act 2017 was introduced by openly gay Liberal Party backbencher, Senator Dean Smith. The bill amended Section 5 of the Marriage Act to define marriage in Australia as the union of "2 people". It also removed the ban on overseas same-sex marriages being recognised in Australia, including ones that occurred before the law change. Additionally, the bill included protections for religious celebrants, ministers of religion and bodies established for a religious purpose, to not be obligated to perform or provide services and facilities to marriages they object to. The bill passed the Senate by 43 votes to 12 on 29 November 2017 and passed the House of Representatives on 7 December 2017 by a vote of 131 to 4; there were 11 abstentions. The bill received royal assent on 8 December 2017 and went into effect the following day. Same-sex marriages lawfully entered into overseas automatically became recognised from that date, and the first weddings after the normal one-month waiting period occurred from 9 January 2018. Several same-sex couples successfully applied for an exemption from the one-month waiting period, and the first legal same-sex wedding under Australian law was held on 15 December 2017, with further weddings taking place the following day.

State and territory law
The federal legalisation of same-sex marriage extended to all of Australia's states and territories, including the external territories.

States and territories have long had the ability to create laws with respect to relationships, though Section 51 (xxi) of the Constitution of Australia prescribes that marriage is a legislative power of the Federal Parliament.

Since the Commonwealth (i.e: Federal Parliament) introduced the Marriage Act Cth. 1961, marriage laws in Australia were generally regarded as an exclusive Commonwealth power. The precise rights of states and territories with respect to creating state-based same-sex marriage laws was complicated further by the Howard Government amendment to the Marriage Act 1961 in 2004 to define marriage as the exclusive union of one man and one woman, to the exclusion of all others. The Australian Capital Territory (ACT) provided a test case on the matter, when in October 2013, the territory's Legislative Assembly passed a law allowing same-sex marriage. The Commonwealth (specifically the Abbott Government) immediately challenged the law in the High Court of Australia. The High Court ruled on the matter in December 2013, five days after the first same-sex weddings were celebrated in the ACT, striking down the ACT's same-sex marriage law. The court determined that all laws with respect to marriage were an exclusive power of the Commonwealth and that no state or territory law creating any other type of marriage could operate concurrently with the federal Marriage Act; "the kind of marriage provided for by the [Marriage] Act is the only kind of marriage that may be formed or recognised in Australia". The court also ruled that a same-sex marriage law passed by the Federal Parliament could operate lawfully. The ruling closed off the possibility for a state or territory to legislate for same-sex marriage in the absence of a federal same-sex marriage law.

Prior to that ruling, reports released by the New South Wales Parliamentary Committee on Social Issues and the Tasmanian Law Reform Institute found that a state parliament "has the power to legislate on the topic of marriage, including same-sex marriage. However, if [New South Wales] chooses to exercise that power and enact a law for same-sex marriage, the law could be subject to challenge in the High Court of Australia" and that no current arguments "present an absolute impediment to achieving state-based or Commonwealth marriage equality". The ACT Government received legal advice supporting the lawfulness of its same-sex marriage law prior to the High Court ruling, though several legal experts expressed doubts.

Aside from the Australian Capital Territory, Tasmania is the only other state or territory to have passed same-sex marriage legislation in a chamber of its legislature. The state lower house passed same-sex marriage legislation by 13 votes to 11 in September 2012, though the upper house subsequently voted against the legislation a few weeks later by 8 votes to 6. Both houses later passed motions giving in-principle, symbolic support for same-sex marriage.

Prior to the federal legalisation of same-sex marriage, six Australian jurisdictions (Tasmania, the Australian Capital Territory, New South Wales, Queensland, Victoria and South Australia), comprising 90% of Australia's population, recognised same-sex marriages and civil partnerships performed overseas, providing automatic recognition of such unions in their respective state registers.

Constitutional and legal issues

There is an important difference in the source of power of the Commonwealth to legislate over married and de facto relationships. Marriage and "matrimonial causes" are supported by sections 51(xxi) and (xxii) of the Constitution. The legal status of marriage is also internationally recognised whereas the power to legislate for de facto relationships and their financial matters relies on referrals by states to the Commonwealth in accordance with Section 51(xxxvii) of the Australian Constitution, where it states the law shall extend only to states by whose parliaments the matter is referred, or which afterward adopt the law.

Transgender and intersex issues
In the 2001 case Re Kevin – validity of marriage of transsexual, the Family Court of Australia recognised the right of transsexual people to marry according to their current gender as opposed to their sex assigned at birth; this did not permit same-sex marriage from the perspective of the genders the prospective partners identified as, but it did mean that a trans woman could legally marry a cisgender man, and a trans man could legally marry a cisgender woman.

In October 2007, the Administrative Appeals Tribunal overturned a decision by the Foreign Affairs Department refusing to issue a transgender woman a passport listing her as female because she was married to a woman. The tribunal ordered that she be issued a passport listing her as female, in accordance with her other official documents, thereby recognising the existence of a marriage between two persons who are legally recognised as female. Same-sex marriage advocates noted that same-sex marriage legislation should be inclusive of the rights transgender and intersex people, with intersex people being skeptical of the term same-sex marriage. These concerns were addressed by the federal legalisation of same-sex marriage in December 2017, which amended the definition of marriage to "2 people".

As of 2017, only South Australia and the Australian Capital Territory did not require transgender people to divorce before registering an official change of gender on a birth certificate. This requirement was removed by federal law in December 2018. Victoria passed legislation removing the forced divorce requirement in May 2018, and similar legislation was passed in New South Wales and Queensland the following month. The Northern Territory passed similar laws in November 2018, and it was followed by Western Australia in February 2019. Tasmania was the last jurisdiction to reform its laws. The state passed legislation removing the forced divorce requirement in April 2019, and it joined some of the other states and territories in also removing the requirement for a person to have undergone sex reassignment surgery prior to having a change of sex recognised on a birth certificate.

Australian marriage legislation

Marriage Act 1961 
The Marriage Act 1961 is a federal Act of the Parliament of Australia. It has been in effect since 1961 and governs the laws and regulations regarding lawful marriages in Australia. With respect to the recognition of same-sex unions, the Act has been amended in 2004 and 2017.

2004 amendments
On 27 May 2004, the then federal Attorney-General, Philip Ruddock, introduced a bill, intending to incorporate the-then common law definition of marriage into the Marriage Act 1961. In June 2004, the bill passed the House of Representatives and the Senate passed the amendment by 38 votes to 6 on 13 August 2004. The bill subsequently received royal assent, becoming the Marriage Amendment Act 2004. The amendment specified that marriage meant "the union of a man and a woman to the exclusion of all others, voluntarily entered into for life." In addition, the bill banned the recognition of same-sex marriages entered into in other jurisdictions.

Attorney-General Ruddock and other Liberals argued that the bill was necessary to protect the institution of marriage, by ensuring that the common law definition was put beyond legal challenge. Labor Shadow Attorney-General Nicola Roxon on the same day the amendment was proposed said that the party would not oppose the amendment, arguing that it did not affect the legal situation of same-sex relationships, merely putting into statute law what was already common law. The Family First senator supported the bill.

Despite having support of the major parties, the bill was contested by sections of the community, human rights groups and some minor political parties. The Greens opposed the bill, calling it the "Marriage Discrimination Act". The Australian Democrats also opposed the bill. Democrat Senator Andrew Bartlett stated that the legislation devalues his marriage, and Greens Senator Bob Brown (himself openly gay) referred to John Howard and the legislation as "hate[ful]". Brown was asked to retract his statements, but refused. Bob Brown additionally described Australia as having a "straight Australia policy", in reference to the 1901 immigration policy of a similar name.

Not all of Labor was in support of the bill. During the bill's second reading, Anthony Albanese, Labor MP for Grayndler said, "what has caused offence is why the Government has rushed in this legislation in what is possibly the last fortnight of parliamentary sittings. This bill is a result of 30 bigoted backbenchers who want to press buttons out there in the community."

2017 amendments

Senator Dean Smith introduced into Parliament a private senator's bill to alter the definition of marriage to allow same-sex couples to marry, after 61.6% of Australians who responded in the Australian Marriage Law Postal Survey voted to support same-sex marriage. The bill amended the definition of "marriage" in the Act, omitting the words "man and a woman" and replacing it with the gender-neutral wording "2 people". The amendment which prevented overseas same-sex marriages from being recognised in Australia was repealed. The bill passed the Senate by 43 votes to 12 on 29 November and passed the House of Representatives by 131 votes to 4 on 7 December 2017.

The bill received royal assent from the Governor-General on 8 December 2017 and came into effect the following day.

As a result of the law, the definition of marriage in Australia is as follows:

Marriage means the union of 2 people to the exclusion of all others, voluntarily entered into for life.

Under section 46 of the Marriage Act 1961, a celebrant is required to say these words, or words to this effect, in every marriage ceremony.

Marriage Equality (Same Sex) Act 2013 (ACT) 

On 13 September 2013, the Australian Capital Territory (ACT) Government announced that it would introduce a bill to legalise same-sex marriage, following a decade-long attempt to legislate in the area. "We've been pretty clear on this issue for some time now and there's overwhelming community support for this", Chief Minister Katy Gallagher said. "We would prefer to see the federal parliament legislate for a nationally consistent scheme, but in the absence of this, we will act for the people of the ACT. The bill would have enabled couples who are not able to marry under the Commonwealth Marriage Act 1961 to enter into marriage in the ACT. It will provide for solemnisation, eligibility, dissolution and annulment, regulatory requirements and notice of intention in relation to same-sex marriages." On 10 October 2013, federal Attorney-General George Brandis confirmed that the Commonwealth Government would challenge the proposed ACT bill, stating that the Coalition Government has significant constitutional concerns with respect to the bill. The bill was debated in the ACT Legislative Assembly on 22 October 2013, and passed by 9 votes to 8. The legislation is known as the Marriage Equality (Same Sex) Act 2013.

Under the legislation, same-sex marriages were legally permitted from 7 December 2013.

As soon as the ACT's law had been passed, the Commonwealth launched a challenge to it in the High Court, which delivered judgment on 12 December 2013. As to the relation between the ACT act and federal legislation, the Court found that the ACT act was invalid and of "no effect", because it was "inconsistent", in terms of the Australian Capital Territory Self-Government Act 1988 (Cth), and the federal Marriage Act 1961 (Cth). It was inconsistent both because its definition of marriage conflicted with that in the federal act and because the federal act was exclusive, leaving no room for any other definition in the legislation of a state or a territory. However, the Court went on to determine that the word "marriage" in Constitution s51(xxi) includes same-sex marriage, thus clarifying that there is no constitutional impediment to the Commonwealth legislating for same-sex marriage in the future. It can do so by amending the definition of "marriage" in the Marriage Act, which it did in December 2017.

Marriage statistics
According to the Australian Bureau of Statistics, approximately 4.6% of all marriages officiated in Australia have been marriages of same-sex couples, since 1 January 2018. The data for the year 2018 indicated that the overwhelming majority of same-sex weddings were administered by a civil celebrant, and that the median age of same-sex couples entering into marriages was notably older than heterosexual couples. Note that the figures below do not include any marriages where one or both of the parties do not identify as either male or female.

Dual British-Australian couples were able to marry in British diplomatic missions in Australia after the United Kingdom legalised same-sex marriage in 2014. From June 2014 to October 2017, 445 same-sex couples took advantage of this and married in British diplomatic offices across Australia.

Source:

State and territory recognition schemes
Same-sex couples have access to different relationship recognition schemes in Australia's eight states and territories. Under federal law, they are treated as de facto relationships. Despite Australia having passed a federal same-sex marriage law, these schemes remain in place as an option for couples.

Civil unions/partnerships
Same-sex couples can enter into civil partnerships in the Australian Capital Territory and Queensland. The schemes include state-sanctioned ceremonies that are similar to marriage ceremonies.

 Australian Capital Territory

Previously, same-sex couples could enter into civil unions in the Australian Capital Territory (ACT). In August 2012, a civil union bill passed the territory Legislative Assembly. The Civil Union Act 2012 granted many of the same rights to same-sex couples as people married under the Marriage Act 1961. The Act was not challenged by the Gillard Government. It was to be repealed and civil unions were to be no longer accessible to same-sex couples upon commencement of the Marriage Equality (Same Sex) Act 2013, which (if not struck down by the High Court) would have permanently legalised same-sex marriage in the territory. Due to the High Court's ruling striking down the ACT's same-sex marriage law as invalid, the repeal of the Act was of no effect and civil unions continued to take place in the ACT until 2017. As of 2017, forming a new civil union is not possible as section 7 of the Civil Union Act 2012 requires that potential couples be unable to marry under the Marriage Act 1961. When same-sex marriage was legalised, it became legally impossible to form a civil union, though existing ones remain valid.

Since 2008, the ACT has recognised civil partnerships which provide same-sex couples with increased rights regarding superannuation, taxation and social security. Although the Civil Partnerships Act 2008 was repealed upon passage of the aforementioned Civil Unions Act 2012, entering into civil partnerships, which are now regulated under part 4A of the Domestic Relationships Act 1994, remains an option for same-sex couples (and opposite-sex couples). Couples can also enter into domestic relationships, which were enacted in 1994.

 Queensland

Civil partnerships, commonly referred to as civil unions, have been legal in Queensland since April 2016. The state Parliament passed the Discrimination Law Amendment Act 2002 in December of that year, which created non-discriminatory definitions of "de facto partner" with respect to 42 pieces of legislation. This gave same-sex couples the same rights as de facto couples in most instances.

On 30 November 2011, the Queensland Parliament passed a bill allowing civil partnerships in the state. The legislation passed by a vote of 47 to 40, with those against including four votes from the Australian Labor Party. The Civil Partnerships Act 2011 allowed for same-sex couples who are Queensland residents to enter into a civil partnership. Shortly after the change of government in the 2012 state elections, and following high profile advertisements for repeal of the law by Katter's Australian Party, the centre-right LNP Government passed the Civil Partnerships and Other Legislation Amendment Act 2012. The new law changed the name from "civil partnership" to "registered relationship" and prohibited the state from offering ceremonies for those who do register their relationship in this manner. Following the 2015 state election, which saw Labor form minority government, the Parliament passed (in December 2015) the Relationships (Civil Partnerships) and Other Acts Amendment Act 2015, which restored state-sanctioned ceremonies for same-sex and opposite-sex couples and once more changed regulations referring to "registered relationships" with "civil partnerships". The law came into effect following a number of administrative matters occurring, with civil partnerships resuming in the state on 2 April 2016.

Registered relationships
Same-sex couples have access to domestic partnership registries (otherwise known as registered relationships) in the Australian Capital Territory, New South Wales, Tasmania, Victoria and South Australia.

 New South Wales

New South Wales, Australia's most populous state, has recognised domestic partnerships since July 2010. The Relationships Register Act 2010 was passed by the Parliament in May and came into effect on 1 July 2010. The Act provides conclusive proof of the existence of a relationship and ensures participants gain all the rights afforded to de facto couples under state and federal law. Previously, in June 2008, the Parliament passed the Miscellaneous Acts Amendment (Same Sex Relationships) Act 2008. The Act amended several other state laws to recognise co-mothers as legal parents of children born through donor insemination and ensure birth certificates allow both mothers to be recognised. Additionally, the Act amended 57 pieces of state legislation to ensure de facto couples, including same-sex couples, are treated equally with married couples. Finally, the Act amended the New South Wales Anti-Discrimination Act 1977 to ensure same-sex couples are protected from discrimination on the basis of their "marital or domestic status" in employment, accommodation and access to other goods and services.

New South Wales has also sought to legislate with respect to same-sex marriage. In November 2013, a bill was introduced to the Legislative Council to legalise same-sex marriage at a state level, thought it was narrowly defeated. The external territory of Norfolk Island has, since 1 July 2016, been incorporated into New South Wales legislation.

 Victoria

Victoria has recognised domestic partnerships since December 2008. The Parliament passed the Relationships Act 2008 on 10 April 2008 and came into effect on 1 December 2008. This allowed same-sex couples to register their relationships with the state Registry of Births, Deaths and Marriages and provide conclusive proof of a de facto relationship, allowing them to receive all the benefits and rights of such a couple under state and federal law. In 2016, the Victorian Parliament passed reforms to the state's domestic partnerships legislation, allowing for the recognition of overseas same-sex marriages on official documents and also allowing couples the option of having an official ceremony when registering for a domestic partnership. The earliest legislative reform in the state designed to provide equal treatment of same-sex couples came in August 2001, in the form of the Statute Law Amendment (Relationships) Act 2001 and the Statute Law Further Amendment (Relationships) Act 2001. The acts amended 60 laws in Victoria to give same-sex couples, called "domestic partners", many rights equal to those enjoyed by de facto couples, including hospital access, medical decision making, superannuation, inheritance rights, property tax, landlord/tenancy rights, mental health treatment and victims of crime procedures.

 South Australia

In South Australia, the Statutes Amendment (Domestic Partners) Act 2006 (Number 43), which took effect 1 June 2007, amended 97 acts, dispensing with the term "de facto" and categorising couples as "domestic partners". This meant same-sex couples and any two people who live together are covered by the same laws. In December 2016, the Parliament passed a law which creates a relationship register for same-sex couples and recognises the relationships of same-sex couples who had married or entered into an official union in other states and nations. This law went into effect on 1 August 2017. Prior to that reform, same-sex couples could make a written agreement called a "domestic partnership agreement" about their living arrangements. This may be prepared at any time and is legal from the time it is made, but must meet other requirements, such as joint commitments, before being recognised as domestic partners.

 Tasmania

In Tasmania, beginning on 1 January 2004, the state's Relationships Act 2003 allows same-sex couples to register their union as a type of domestic partnership in two distinct categories, "significant relationships" and "caring relationships", with the state's Registry of Births, Death and Marriages. The new definition of partner or spouse, "two people in a relationship whether or not it's sexual", was embedded into 80 pieces of legislation, giving same-sex couples rights in making decisions about a partner's health, provides for guardianship when a partner is incapacitated, and gives same-sex couples equal access to a partner's public sector pensions. It also allows one member of a same-sex couple to adopt the biological child of their partner. In September 2010, the Tasmanian Parliament unanimously passed legislation to recognise same-sex marriages performed in other jurisdictions as registered partnerships under the Relationships Act 2003, making it the first Australian state or territory to do so.

In August 2012, a bill was introduced into the Tasmanian Parliament to legalise same-sex marriage. The bill passed the lower house, but was later rejected by the upper house on 28 September 2012. In October 2013, the bill was re-introduced into the upper house and was defeated once more.

Registered partnership recognition in state governments

No local scheme
Same-sex and opposite-sex de facto couples exist in all states and territories. Before the introduction of same-sex marriage nationally, the inability of de facto couples to have conclusive evidence of their relationships in Western Australia and the Northern Territory made it more difficult for them to access rights accorded to them under the law. This section briefly discusses the historical situation in those jurisdictions, which lack registered partnerships for same-sex (or opposite-sex) couples.

 Northern Territory

In the Northern Territory, in March 2004, the Parliament enacted the Law Reform (Gender, Sexuality and De Facto Relationships) Act 2003 to remove legislative discrimination against same-sex couples in most areas of territory law (except the Adoption of Children Act 1994) and recognise same-sex couples as de facto relationships. The Act removed distinctions based on a person's gender, sexuality or de facto relationship in approximately 50 acts and regulations. As in New South Wales and the Australian Capital Territory, the reforms also enabled the lesbian partner of a woman to be recognised as the parent of her partner's child across state law.

 Western Australia

In Western Australia, the Acts Amendment (Lesbian and Gay Law Reform) Act 2002 removed all remaining legislative discrimination toward sexual orientation by adding the new definition of "de facto partner" into 62 acts, provisions and statutes and created new family law designed to recognise same-sex couples as de facto relationships.

Local government schemes
A number of local government councils in Australia have created relationship recognition schemes, which allow couples to register their relationship and provide conclusive proof of a de facto union for the purposes of federal law. 
 City of Sydney, New South Wales - Registered partnerships since 2004
 Municipality of Woollahra, New South Wales - Registered partnerships since 2008
 City of Blue Mountains, New South Wales - Registered partnerships since 2010
 City of Vincent, Western Australia - Registered partnerships since 2012
 Town of Port Hedland, Western Australia - Registered partnerships since 2015

In Victoria, the cities of Melbourne and Yarra established relationship declaration registers in 2007. Both local governments discontinued the registers in 2018, after the federal legalisation of same-sex marriage.

Local government motions
Local government groups have also published official positions in favour of same-sex marriage. In June 2016, the Australian Local Government Association (ALGA) approved a motion supporting the legalisation of same-sex marriage. The motion was put forward by Lord Mayor of Darwin Katrina Fong Lim and Meghan Hopper, a member of the Council of Moreland. It was approved by a strong majority at ALGA's National General Assembly. The motion reads the following;

The motion went before the ALGA's board for approval, which the board provided on 21 July 2016.

As of 1 January 2018, of the 546 local governments (also known as "councils" or "shires") in Australia, a total of 62 are known to have passed formal motions in support of the legalisation of same-sex marriage.

Those local governments are:
 City of Sydney, City of Greater Geelong, City of Hobart, City of Moreland, City of Vincent, Camden Council, City of Hawkesbury, Coonamble Shire, City of Randwick, Tenterfield Shire, Inner West Council, Lachlan Shire, Bega Valley Shire, City of Blue Mountains, Surf Coast Shire, Shire of Hepburn, City of Lismore, City of Albury, City of Ballarat, City of Wodonga, City of Glenorchy, Byron Shire, City of Port Phillip, City of Glen Eira, City of Hobsons Bay, City of Darebin, Shire of Buloke, City of Greater Shepparton, City of Maribyrnong, Central Coast Council, Kingborough Council, Shire of Strathbogie, Richmond Valley Council, City of Melbourne, City of Banyule, City of Yarra, Shire of Indigo, Town of Port Hedland, City of Darwin, City of Brisbane, City of Lake Macquarie, City of Shoalhaven, City of Monash, City of Kingston, City of Whittlesea, City of Fremantle, City of Bayswater, Bass Coast Shire, Shire of Cardinia, City of Willoughby, North Sydney Council, City of Warrnambool, Shire of Noosa, Municipality of Woollahra, Shire of Douglas, Shire of Campaspe, City of Newcastle, City of Moonee Valley, City of Stonnington, Waverley Municipal Council, City of Greater Bendigo, Bellingen Shire, and Shire of Nillumbik

No other local governments are considering a motion to support same-sex marriage.

At least two local governments have rejected motions to support same-sex marriage:
 City of Launceston 
 Shire of Campaspe (later voted to support same-sex marriage)

Public opinion

The table below shows the results of opinion polls conducted to ascertain the level of support for the introduction of same-sex marriage in Australia.

According to a survey, published in late January 2018 by the Social Research Center along with the Australian National University, same-sex marriage was ranked the most historic event to have shaped the lives of Australians. 30% of the survey participants named the legalisation of same-sex marriage as the most historic event in their lifetime, 27% named the September 11 attacks, 13% named former Prime Minister Kevin Rudd's apology to indigenous Australians and another 13% named the Port Arthur massacre.

Religious performance
Most major religious organisations in Australia do not perform same-sex marriages in their places of worship.
 Christianity
 Catholic Church – The Catholic Church opposes same-sex marriage and "views marriage as a unique relationship between a woman and a man".
 Baptist – The National Council of Australian Baptist Ministries "rejects moves to extend the definition of marriage to include same-sex relationships".
 Anglican Church – The Anglican Church's official position is that marriage is "an exclusive and lifelong union of a man and a woman", though a number of prominent members of the church have stated support for same-sex marriage, and the prospect of a formal split on the issue has been canvassed. In October 2018, the Anglican Diocese of Sydney banned same-sex marriages and events that might advocate "expressions of human sexuality contrary to our doctrine of marriage" on about a thousand church-owned properties. In November 2020, the church's Appellate Tribunal approved the right of individual dioceses to formally bless the weddings of same-sex couples married in civil ceremonies.
 Eastern Orthodox – The church considers marriage "a sacrament... through which the union of man and woman is sanctified by God".
 Pentecostalism – The religion's chief representative group, Australian Christian Churches, opposes same-sex marriage.
 Presbyterian Church – The church opposes same-sex marriage and responded to the results of the same-sex marriage survey by stating it "continues to hold to the biblical definition of marriage as between one man and one woman as we believe it best reflects the Lord’s creational design for human flourishing".
 Uniting Church – In July 2018, the National Assembly approved the creation of marriage rites for same-sex couples. The change incorporated a gender-neutral definition of marriage in the church's official statement, though also retained the existing statement on marriage as a heterosexual union, which the church describes as an "equal yet distinct" approach to the issue. Same-sex marriages have been permitted in the church since 21 September 2018.
 Islam – Most Islamic scholars are in agreement that homosexuality is "incompatible with Islamic theology". The Australian National Imams Council "affirms that Islam sanctifies marriage as only being between a man and a woman".
 Buddhism – The Federation of Australian Buddhist Council states there is no fixed or pre-ordained form of marriage, though it "has been consistent in its support for same-sex marriage since 2012".
 Hinduism – The Australian Council of Hindu Clergy issued a clarifying statement in September 2017 stating that marriage under Hinduism is between a man and a woman; the group having come to the position after a formal vote was taken indicating 90% approval for the position.
 Judaism – Same-sex marriages can be performed in Reform Jewish synagogues, but are not permitted in Orthodox or Conservative traditions.

See also
 Australian family law
 Gay and Lesbian Kingdom of the Coral Sea Islands
 LGBT rights in Australia
 Marriage in Australia
 History of same-sex marriage in Australia
 Same-sex marriage in the Australian Capital Territory
 Recognition of same-sex unions in Tasmania
 Recognition of same-sex unions in Oceania
 He never married

Notes

References

Further reading

External links
 Parliament of Australia – Same-sex marriage: issues for the 44th Parliament – publication detailing the same-sex marriage issue in Australia and recent developments
 Parliament of Australia – Chronology of same-sex marriage legislation – extensive timeline of same-sex marriage related legislation introduced in the Australian Parliament
Tasmanian Law Reform Institute – The Legal Issues Relating to Same-Sex Marriage, October 2013 report

 
Australian family law
2017 in LGBT history